Gun laws in New York regulate the sale, possession, and use of firearms and ammunition in the U.S. state of New York, outside of New York City which has separate licensing regulations. These regulations are very strict in comparison to the rest of the United States.

New York Civil Rights Law art. II, § 4 provides that "A well regulated militia being necessary to the security of a free state, the right of the people to keep and bear arms cannot be infringed." Similar text is also contained in the Second Amendment to the United States Constitution.

New York state law does not require a license to own or possess rifles or shotguns, but does require a permit to legally possess or own a pistol. All firearms must comply with the NY SAFE Act, which bans firearms that it defines as assault weapons, unless they were owned prior to the ban and registered by April 15, 2014. Law enforcement is partially exempt from this law.

The City of New York has its own set of laws, and requires a license to own any firearm.

The U.S. Supreme Court in the case District of Columbia v. Heller,  554 U.S. 570 (2008), ruled that "the right to bear arms" is an individual right and a right to arms in common use are protected under the Second Amendment to the United States Constitution. The Court further ruled that this right applies against the states in McDonald v. Chicago, 561 U.S. 742 (2010).

In 2013, the Second Circuit asked the New York Court of Appeals whether part-time state residents are eligible for a pistol permit under New York law, to which the Court answered in the affirmative.

On June 5, 2022, governor Kathy Hochul signed New York Assembly Bill A10503 into effect. The bill raises the minimum age to purchase a semi-automatic rifle to 21, and requires a license for all new semi-automatic rifle purchases. Semi-automatic rifles owned prior to this date are grandfathered. This bill was passed in response to the 2022 Buffalo shooting, and the Robb Elementary school shooting.

In a 2012 ruling, the United States Court of Appeals for the Second Circuit upheld New York's law requiring gun owners who seek a concealed weapon permit to prove a special need for protection; the decision in Kachalsky v. County of Westchester, 701 F.3d 81, held that New York's laws do not violate the right to keep and bear arms. This ruling was abrogated on June 23, 2022, as the Supreme Court ruled that the state's requirement for concealed carry permit applicants to show “proper cause” (the so-called “may-issue” policy) is unconstitutional.

Overview 
New York is generally perceived to be a highly restrictive state for purchasing, possessing, or carrying firearms, as most firearms regulations are defined at the local level. This is especially the case for New York City and its surrounding suburbs, and larger urban centers throughout the state where most New York State residents live and work. In contrast, most rural areas in New York State have relatively permissive firearms policies, particularly with respect to concealed carry. 

Most of New York State's gun laws are covered in two sections of New York Penal Law: Article 265 - Firearms and Other Dangerous Weapons, and Article 400 - Licensing and Other Provisions Relating to Firearms. These laws ban handgun possession and provide exemptions, including individuals licensed to carry handguns or to possess them for other reasons, including sports, repair, or disposal. As the law's title indicates, New York's restrictive laws also apply to other items regarded as deadly weapons, such as certain chemical sprays, clubs, explosives, fireworks, knives, rockets, slingshots,  stun guns, and throwing stars. The ban on stun guns was ruled unconstitutional.

Statewide, New York enforces various firearm related prohibitions, many proscriptions similarly listed in the now-expired Federal Assault Weapons Ban. On January 15, 2013, the state assault weapons ban was made more restrictive by the NY SAFE Act. Specified rifle magazines are banned: a) manufactured after 1994; and b) the magazine holds in excess of 10 rounds (handguns included). In December 2013, a federal judge ruled the seven-round magazine limitation is "'tenuous, straitened, and unsupported,' and therefore unconstitutional." Any semi-automatic rifle (with a detachable magazine) or shotgun (non-pump) with just one of these features are banned: 1) pistol grip; 2) bayonet lug; 3) telescoping or folding stock; 4) flash suppressor; 5) threaded barrel; or 6) grenade launcher. The SAFE Act expanded the ban to add the following features: 7) muzzle brake (Dec 2014 Federal court All references to muzzle "break [sic]" be stricken); 8) muzzle compensator; 9) thumbhole stock; and 10) foregrip. All semi-automatic versions of assault-style rifles and shotguns purchased prior to January 15, 2013 are grandfathered, but must be registered within one year of the SAFE Act passage.

Permits issued in New York are valid statewide, except in NYC, unless validated by the NYC police commissioner. A NYC concealed carry license is valid throughout the state. NY Penal Code 400 (6).

For example, regardless of license, all New York residents with a concealed carry permit must still obtain a New York State Pistol Permit, apply for a purchase document for each handgun purchased, and may possess only those handguns the license holder has registered with the state.

New York has enacted a red flag law, prohibits teachers from being armed, banned bump stocks, instituted a 30 day waiting period for purchasers who don't pass the background check instantly, and operates a gun buyback program.

Summary table

Handgun licensing

Overview
The purchase of a handgun in New York is limited to only those individuals who hold a valid pistol permit issued by a county or major city within New York, and present to the seller a purchase document issued by the licensing authority, with the specific make, model, caliber, and serial number of the handgun indicated on the document. The possession of a handgun in New York is limited only to those individuals who hold a valid pistol license and are in possession of a registered handgun (one that appears on the license, indicating the specific make, model, caliber, and serial number of the handgun). The carry of a handgun in New York is limited only to those individuals who hold a valid pistol license, possess a registered handgun, and are carrying said handgun in compliance with the restrictions as they appear on the license and other applicable state and federal law.

New York State Pistol Permits are not issued to out-of-state residents, although New York will issue pistol licenses to part-time residents. New York does not honor licenses or permits from any other states, although some states will recognize New York licenses without a formal agreement.

Application

Application for a handgun license is made through an individual's county or major city of primary residence, usually the police or sheriff's department, or a separate licensing authority. In NYC, the licensing authority is the police commissioner. In Nassau and Suffolk counties on Long Island, the licensing officer is the county police commissioner or county sheriff, depending on where one resides. The licensing authority is a county court judge, or more rarely, a supreme court judge. State and FBI criminal records, along with state mental health records, are checked as part of the licensing process. In addition, applicants are required to supply four personal references from individuals unrelated to them by blood or marriage. These individuals may be required to fill out forms, varying in length by county, attesting to the applicant's "good character". Pistol license approvals can take from less than four months to more than six months, even though the law allows the licensing authorities no more than six months to process a license.

Types of licenses and restrictions

Three types of pistol permits can be issued: possess on premises, a restricted permit limited to target and hunting only, and unrestricted concealed carry. Concealed carry permits may be restricted, but restrictions do not have the force of law. Permits issued outside of NYC are not valid in NYC unless a special license is issued granting validity.

In addition to laws pertaining to the entire state, there are additional laws and statutes pertaining to licensing and permits in some of the major cities of the state. However, NYC is the only place where an individual holding a valid New York State firearm license, obtained outside of NYC,  who is traveling through NYC with a firearm must make no stops and must keep the firearm and ammo in separate locked containers that are not immediately accessible by the driver or any passengers during travel. 

In New York State, pistol licenses are generally of two types: carry or premises-only. "Premises-only" is the most common license issued in NYC and is supposed to be "Shall-Issue." Restrictions can be placed on either of the above types of licenses; for example, many jurisdictions allow handgun license holders to carry handguns only while hunting (i.e., sportsman's license) and/or traveling to and from the range (i.e., target license).

Regional and cultural differences throughout the state

Restrictions on handgun licenses in New York vary greatly from jurisdiction to jurisdiction. In contrast to "no carry" New York City, and some counties which only issue "to and from target shooting and hunting" licenses, many upstate counties issue unrestricted pistol licenses that allow unrestricted concealed carry of a loaded handgun (except at schools, court houses or courtrooms, and secure areas of airports).

This dichotomy in New York's handgun license policies is an outgrowth of two specific cultural forces: the strength of home rule in the state and the tradition of the various hunting seasons in the rural counties.

Assault weapons

State law defines an assault weapon as:

 Semi-automatic rifles able to accept detachable magazines and one or more of the following:
 Folding or telescoping stock
 A pistol grip that protrudes conspicuously beneath the action of the weapon
 A thumbhole stock
 A second handgrip or a protruding grip that can be held by the non-trigger hand
 A bayonet mount
 A flash suppressor, muzzle break, muzzle compensator, or threaded barrel designed to accommodate one
 A grenade launcher

 Semi-automatic pistols with detachable magazines and one or more of the following:
 Magazine that attaches outside the pistol grip
 Threaded barrel to attach barrel extender, flash suppressor, handgrip, or suppressor
 Barrel shroud that can be used as a handhold
 Unloaded weight of 50 oz (1.4 kg) or more
 A semi-automatic version of a fully automatic firearm
 A folding, telescoping or thumbhole stock

 Semi-automatic shotguns with one or more of the following:
 Folding or telescoping stock 
 Thumbhole stock
 A second handgrip or a protruding grip that can be held by the non-trigger hand
 A fixed magazine capacity in excess of 7 rounds 
 The ability to accept a detachable magazine

Magazines 
In general, magazines are required to have a maximum capacity of 10 rounds.

A "large capacity ammunition feeding device" is any belt, drum, strip, magazine, or similar instrument used to feed ammunition into a firearm that has a capability of holding more than ten rounds.

Exceptions
For the purposes of this section, "large capacity ammunition feeding devices" manufactured at least 50 years prior to the current date will be referred to as "antique magazines". Magazines that are not legally limited to 10 rounds and were manufactured at any point in time will be referred to as "standard capacity magazines".

A firearm is considered "antique" if it was manufactured at least 50 years prior to the current date. Antique firearms can still be continued to be purchased and sold so long as one registers them after purchasing them, even if they would be considered assault weapons otherwise. This transfer exemption also applies to antique magazines, although these must be specifically registered to the antique firearm. This exemption is the only way an ordinary citizen can still obtain assault weapons (such as G43's, SVT-40's, older AR-15's, and M1 carbines with bayonet lugs) and standard capacity magazines.

Police officers who are residents of the state may still own assault weapons and standard capacity magazines. Retired police officers may also own assault weapons and standard capacity magazines if they acquired them during the course of their career, due to a carve-out in the amended SAFE Act.

Federally licensed firearms dealers that are licensed as a dealer or gunsmith under New York law may continue to possess assault weapons and standard capacity magazines.

Military members stationed within the state may still bring assault weapons and standard capacity magazines into the state, provided the military member has approval from their command.

New York City

Licensing 
Residents of NYC who wish to obtain a firearms license must apply online through the New York Police Department License Division.

There are currently six types of pistol licenses: Premise License, Carry Business License, Limited Carry Business License, Special Carry License, Carry Guard License, and Law Enforcement Retiree License.

NYC premises-only licenses are the licenses issued to average citizens who cannot show a need for self-defense greater than any other average citizen. They are clearly marked: RESTRICTED - NOT FOR CARRY. Most licenses issued in NYC are for on-premises possession only, for self-defense within the home or business.

Security guards and business people who regularly carry valuables may be issued a Restricted Business Carry License which is valid only while conducting the business specifically as it was described, in great detail, on the application for the license.

There is also a rifle/shotgun permit, issued for the purchase and possession of rifles and shotguns.

Transport 
In response to the Supreme Court granting certiorari in New York State Rifle & Pistol Association, Inc. v. City of New York, and in an attempt to prevent a Supreme Court decision, state law was amended to allow transporting the handgun to and from a target range, home, business, or any other place one is authorized to possess such handgun, but the firearm must be unloaded and in a locked container. Previously in NYC, firearms could only be transported directly to and from a range within city limits. Traveling through NYC with a license issued from another jurisdiction within the state must be done in accordance with local law.

A person carrying a firearm without a valid permit in NYC may be charged with "criminal possession of a weapon in the second degree," a felony. Unlawfully carrying a firearm in NYC is typically punishable by a prison term of 3 1/2 years. A high-profile example of the penalties associated with New York's restrictive gun laws is the 2-year prison sentence served by former New York Giants wide receiver Plaxico Burress, after pleading guilty to unlawful possession of a weapon, stemming from negligently shooting himself in the leg at an NYC nightclub with his concealed handgun, for which he did not have a valid NYC concealed carry permit. At the time of the incident, Burress had a Florida concealed carry license, which is not valid in New York.

Miscellaneous 
In November 2012, then-mayor Michael Bloomberg denied a request by the New York National Guard for its members to carry service weapons to help maintain order in devastated parts of the city in the aftermath of Hurricane Sandy, calling the presence of armed service members in Brooklyn "a bad idea," and further stating, "The NYPD is the only people we want on the street with guns."

In 2021, the state's gun laws were challenged in New York State Rifle & Pistol Association, Inc. v. Bruen, claiming the laws infringe on their Second Amendment rights. The Supreme Court ruled in favor of the association, affirming the rights of New Yorkers to obtain a carry license without first having to demonstrate a special need for one.

City ordinances and New York's state laws also require medical facilities to notify the police within a specified period of time after admitting anyone with gunshot wounds. Hospitals or clinics that fail to comply with this requirement face fines and other penalties.

Rifles and shotguns, antique handguns

Prior to January 15, 2013, rifles deemed assault-style did not have to be registered in any jurisdiction within New York except for NYC. Since enactment of the NY SAFE Act, all grandfathered operable assault-style rifles purchased prior to January 15, 2013 must now be registered. The deadline to register these firearms was on or before January 14, 2014.

Contrary to handguns, N.Y. state law does not ban the open carry of shotguns or rifles, except in restricted buildings such as schools and courthouses.

New York City 
NYC has additional restrictions, such as requiring rifle/shotgun magazines to have a maximum capacity of five rounds.

Antiques and replica handguns must be registered to be legally loaded and fired.

Non-resident travel throughout the state

State law provides restricted exceptions for interstate transportation of firearms by non-residents. Non-residents may transport any lawful firearm through the state to any place outside of it where an individual may lawfully possess and carry such firearm. 

The firearm must be unloaded while in transit within the state. The firearm and any ammunition for it must not be easily accessible by anyone in the vehicle's driver or passenger area. For example, the gun and ammunition must be kept in the storage area of the vehicle, such as a car's "trunk." In vehicles without a storage area separate from the driver or passenger compartment, the firearm or ammunition shall be contained in a locked container other than the glove compartment or console." One may also transport a firearm for target competition purposes, "by a person who is a member or coach of an accredited college or university target pistol team" and "while attending or traveling to or from, an organized competitive pistol match or league competition under auspices of, or approved by, the National Rifle Association and in which [they are] a competitor, within 48 hours of such event or by a person who is a non-resident of the state while attending or traveling to or from an organized match sanctioned by the International Handgun Metallic Silhouette Association and in which he is a competitor, within 48 hours of such event."

Federal protections

The state of New York is of particular concern to interstate motorists who travel with firearms because it separates all six New England states from the rest of the United States. This means that under the Firearm Owners Protection Act (FOPA), all people traveling through the state with firearms are protected by federal law, however they must have their firearms unloaded and locked in a hard case where they are not readily accessible (e.g. in the trunk of a vehicle).

A New York Court of Appeals decision in 2019 stated that an out-of-state gun dealer cannot be prosecuted in New York for selling a gun that was later resold into the black market.

Miscellaneous laws
Gun shows: New York requires anyone who buys a gun at a gun show to pass a background check.

Youth and firearms: Youths between ages 14 and 21 may shoot a handgun at a range only if they are under the supervision of a military officer or licensed professional, have not been convicted of a felony, and do not seem to be a danger to themselves or others. Youths between 12 and 15 may only possess to load or fire a firearm when supervised by an adult with specific qualifications.  Children under the age of 12 are not permitted to possess a firearm with the intention to load or fire it.

In New York City, only adults at least 21 years of age or older can purchase or own a firearm with a permit or license issued by the NYPD. In the rest of the state, adults 18 years of age or older can purchase long guns (rifles & shotguns) without a permit, and only adults 21 years of age or older can purchase or possess a handgun (with the proper licensing requirements). Minors who are at least 16 years of age can possess long guns. Age restrictions on purchasing apply for both FFL dealers and private sales or transfers. 

In June 2022, Governor Kathy Hochul signed legislation to ban persons under the age of 21 from purchasing semi-automatic rifles, ban soft body armor for civilian use, and require gun owners to obtain a license before legally taking possession of new semi-automatic rifles in the state. Those between 18 and 21 are still permitted to purchase other rifles (bolt action, pump action, lever or single-shot) and can generally buy all categories of shotguns.

Those between the ages of 18-21 can only purchase handguns if they are current or honorably discharged members of the armed forces or if they are law enforcement officers.

State assault weapons ban: New York's ban is one of the most restrictive in the country. 

Ghost guns: As of 2019, making, selling, transporting or possessing 3-D-printed guns or other undetectable firearms are prohibited. New York City further bans metal 80% lower receivers that can be used to make a firearm. 

Cross registration of handguns: Some counties limit who can register a handgun on their license, with some allowing cross registration of a handgun from any other licensee, to licensed family members only, to no handgun can be cross registered. State law does not address this issue. Sharing use of a handgun not listed on one's license is only allowed at a certified range with the licensed handgun owner present.

Examples of local laws: NYC, for example, limits the color of all guns by banning colors that would make an actual gun appear like a toy gun, and bans the ownership and sale of all BB guns, paintball guns, air guns, and pellet guns without an appropriate license. Yonkers requires a state pistol permit before one may apply for a permit to own a BB or pellet handgun.

Renewal fees: There are periodic renewal fees, including on restricted carry licenses, like NYC's $340 for a three-year license. Nassau,Westchester and several other suburban counties allow a "to and from the range only" form of concealed carry.

Periodic renewal of licenses: Most counties in the state issue "lifetime" licenses. Elsewhere than in the City of New York and the counties of Nassau and Westchester, any license to carry or possess a pistol or revolver shall be in force and effect until revoked. Renewable licenses vary in cost and last from the 3-year New York City license to five years in the other counties, with New York City's license costing $340 every three years and by contrast, a renewal charge of $10.00 in Suffolk County every 5 years.

Nunchuks: New York's ban on nunchuks was ruled unconstitutional on December 14, 2018.

Gravity knives: New York's classification of gravity knives as "deadly weapons", which led to common inadvertent violations of the law by tradesmen, was repealed on May 30, 2019, thus allowing their possession. The law was previously deemed unconstitutionally vague.

Some local counties have adopted Second Amendment sanctuary resolutions in opposition to some gun control laws.

NY SAFE Act

In the wake of the Sandy Hook Elementary School shooting and the 2012 Webster shooting, New York became the first U.S. state to enact stricter gun control laws on January 15, 2013, when Gov. Andrew Cuomo signed the NY SAFE Act. New measures included redefining what an assault weapon is, assault weapon registration, prohibition of sales of assault weapons, the prevention of selling or passing on registered assault weapons to friends or family, reducing the maximum allowed magazine capacity from ten rounds to seven rounds, (this part of the SAFE act was redacted in court, as New York State, the court ruled, failed to produce evidence that the provision would stop criminals from simply adding three more rounds to get the magazine to its full, 10-round potential. This ruling makes it again legal to place the full 10 rounds in a detachable or fixed magazine), background checks on almost all gun sales including private sales, background checks on all ammunition sales (has yet to go into effect), additional requirements for reporting of persons with mental health issues, and increased penalties for certain gun crimes. The SAFE Act also includes provisions allowing law enforcement to preemptively seize a person's firearms without a warrant or court order if they have probable cause that the person in question may be mentally unstable or intends to use the weapons to commit a crime.

See also 
Law of New York
NY SAFE Act
Sullivan Act
Concealed carry in the United States § Reciprocity

References

New York (state) law
New York